The St. Louis Cardinals 2000 season was the team's 119th season in St. Louis, Missouri and the 109th season in the National League.  The Cardinals went 95-67 during the season, their best finish since 1987, and won the National League Central division by ten games over the Cincinnati Reds.  In the playoffs the Cardinals defeated the Atlanta Braves 3 games to 0 in the NLDS but lost to the New York Mets 4 games to 1 in the NLCS.

The Cardinals sweep of the Braves in the NLDS was notable because it made the Mets run to their first World Series appearance since their championship season of  much easier. The Braves had eliminated the Mets from the playoffs on the final day of the 1998 season and in the 1999 NLCS.

Catcher Mike Matheny and outfielder Jim Edmonds won Gold Gloves this year.  Matheny was acquired from the Toronto Blue Jays during the off-season, while Edmonds was acquired from the Anaheim Angels less than a week before the start of the season.

Offseason
November 11, 1999: Alberto Castillo, Matt DeWitt, and Lance Painter were traded by the Cardinals to the Toronto Blue Jays for Paul Spoljaric and Pat Hentgen.
November 16, 1999: Manny Aybar, Brent Butler, Rich Croushore, and José Jiménez were traded by the Cardinals to the Colorado Rockies for Darryl Kile, Luther Hackman and Dave Veres.
 November 24, 1999: Heathcliff Slocumb was signed as a free agent by the Cardinals.
December 15, 1999: Luis Ordaz was traded by the Cardinals to the Arizona Diamondbacks for Dante Powell.
January 5, 2000: Ernie Young was signed as a free agent with the St. Louis Cardinals.
March 18, 2000: Joe McEwing was traded by the Cardinals to the New York Mets for Jesse Orosco.
March 23, 2000: Kent Bottenfield was traded by the St. Louis Cardinals with Adam Kennedy to the Anaheim Angels for Jim Edmonds.

Regular season

Opening Day starters
 Eric Davis
 Jim Edmonds
 Darryl Kile
 Ray Lankford
 Mike Matheny
 Craig Paquette
 Édgar Rentería
 Fernando Tatís
 Fernando Viña

Season standings

Record vs. opponents

Transactions
 June 5:  Released Mike Mohler.
 July 31:  Traded Heathcliff Slocumb and Ben Johnson to the San Diego Padres for Carlos Hernández and Nate Tebbs (minors).
  July 31: Traded José León with cash to the Baltimore Orioles for Will Clark.  Acquired to play in place of the injured Mark McGwire, Clark responded with a .964 OPS and hit a home run in each of his first four games with the new club.   He performed better in the 2000 playoffs (.345 BA) than in recent years.  After announcing that his retirement would come when the Cardinals' playoff run ended, Clark went 1 for 3 in his final game on October 16, 2000, in the NLCS against the New York Mets,

Roster

Player stats

Batting

Starters by position
Note: Pos = Position; G = Games played; AB = At bats; H = Hits; Avg. = Batting average; HR = Home runs; RBI = Runs batted in

Other batters
Note: G = Games played; AB = At bats; H = Hits; Avg. = Batting average; HR = Home runs; RBI = Runs batted in

Pitching

Starting pitchers
Note: G = Games pitched; IP = Innings pitched; W = Wins; L = Losses; ERA = Earned run average; SO = Strikeouts

Relief pitchers
Note: G = Games pitched; W = Wins; L = Losses; SV = Saves; ERA = Earned run average; SO = Strikeouts

NLDS

St. Louis won series, 3-0.  This was the series in which pitching phenom Rick Ankiel permanently lost his command and control, throwing four wild pitches in one inning.

NLCS

Game 1
October 11: Busch Stadium, St. Louis, Missouri

Game 2

October 12: Busch Stadium, St. Louis, Missouri

Game 3

October 14: Shea Stadium, Flushing, New York

Game 4

October 15: Shea Stadium, Flushing, New York

Game 5

October 16: Shea Stadium, Flushing, New York

Farm system

References

External links
2000 St. Louis Cardinals at Baseball Reference
2000 St. Louis Cardinals team page at www.baseball-almanac.com

St. Louis Cardinals seasons
National League Central champion seasons
St Louis